East Gloucestershire, formally the Eastern division of Gloucestershire and often referred to as Gloucestershire Eastern, was a parliamentary constituency in Gloucestershire, represented in the House of Commons of the Parliament of the United Kingdom. It elected two Members of Parliament (MPs) using the bloc vote system.

The constituency was created when the Great Reform Act split Gloucestershire into eastern and western divisions, with effect from the 1832 general election.

Under the Redistribution of Seats Act 1885, East Gloucestershire was abolished from the 1885 election, when the former eastern and western divisions were replaced by five new single-seat county constituencies: Cirencester, Forest of Dean, Stroud, Tewkesbury, and Thornbury.

Boundaries 
1832–1885: The Hundreds of Crowthorne and Minety, Brightwell's Barrow, Bradley, Rapsgate, Bisley, Longtree, Whitstone, Kiftsgate, Westminster, Deerhurst, Slaughter, Cheltenham, Cleeve, Tibaldston, Tewkesbury, and Dudstone and King's Barton, and also the City and County of Gloucester and the Borough of Cirencester.

The constituency was the eastern division of the historic county of Gloucestershire, in South West England.

The place of election was at Gloucester. This was where the hustings were situated and electors voted by spoken declaration in public, before the secret ballot was introduced in 1872.

The qualification to vote in county elections, in the period when this constituency operated, was to be a 40 shilling freeholder.

The parliamentary borough constituencies of Cheltenham, Cirencester, Gloucester, Stroud, and Tewkesbury were all located in East Gloucestershire. Qualified freeholders from those boroughs could vote in the county division. Bristol was a "county of itself", so its freeholders qualified to vote in the borough, not in any county division.

Members of Parliament

Election results

Elections in the 1880s 

 
 

 Caused by Hicks Beach's appointment as Chancellor of the Exchequer.

Elections in the 1870s 

 
 

 Caused by Hicks-Beach's appointment as Chief Secretary to the Lord Lieutenant of Ireland.

  
 

 
 

 
 

 Caused by Holford's resignation.

Elections in the 1860s 

 
 

 
 

  
 

 
 

 
 

 Caused by Codrington's death.

Elections in the 1850s 

 
 

 
 

 
 

 
 

 
 

 Caused by Hicks-Beach's death.

  
 
 
 

 

Caused by Henry Somerset's succession to the Peerage as 8th Duke of Beaufort

Elections in the 1840s 

 
 

 
 

 
 

Resignation of Charteris

Elections in the 1830s 

 
 

 
 

 
 

 
 

 
 

 

 

Death of Guise

References 

 British Parliamentary Election Results 1832-1885, compiled and edited by F. W. S. Craig (Macmillan Press 1977)
 The Parliaments of England by Henry Stooks Smith (1st edition published in three volumes 1844–50), second edition edited (in one volume) by F. W. S. Craig (Political Reference Publications 1973))
 Who's Who of British Members of Parliament: Volume I 1832-1885, edited by M. Stenton (The Harvester Press 1976)

Politics of Gloucestershire
Parliamentary constituencies in South West England (historic)
Constituencies of the Parliament of the United Kingdom established in 1832
Constituencies of the Parliament of the United Kingdom disestablished in 1885